"5 Rebbecca's" is the first single released by Dundee indie band The View from their second album Which Bitch?. The single was released on 27 October 2008.

The music video for the single was released on YouTube on 23 September 2008, with a handwritten version of the lyrics released on the band's website two days later. The video itself features a mixture of live action footage with animation.

In its first week after release, the single marked a disappointing return for The View, only reaching number 57 on the UK Singles Chart before dropping out of the UK top 100 the following week. In Scotland, however, the song debuted at number two, giving the band their third top-three single there, after the number-one singles "Wasted Little DJs" and "Same Jeans".

Track listing
 UK CD
 "5 Rebbecca's" – 3:51
 "Dun Deal" – 4:46
 "Mr Men Book" – 3:16
 UK 7"

 "5 Rebbecca's"
 "For You"

Charts

References

2008 singles
The View (band) songs
2008 songs
Songs written by Kyle Falconer
Songs written by Kieren Webster